Nava Ugla, also known as Ugla, is a village / panchayat located in the Gir Gadhada Taluka of Gir Somnath district in Gujarat, India. Earlier, until August 2013, Nava Ugla was part of Una Taluka and Junagadh district. The latitude 20.940104 and longitude 71.036577 are the geo-coordinate of the Village Nava Ugla. Gandhinagar is the state capital of Nava Ugla village which is located around 350 kilometres away from Nava Ugla.

According to Census 2011, with the 178 families, the population of this village is 958. Out of this, 486 are males and 472 are females. Most residents are dependent on agriculture.

Demographics 
According to the 2011 census of India, Nava Ugla has 178 households. The effective literacy rate (i.e. the literacy rate of population excluding children aged 6 and below) is 68.01%

List of villages in Gir Gadhada Taluka
Below is the Revenue records list of forty-three villages of Gir Gadhada Taluka including Gir Gadhada village.

Ambavad
Ankolali
Babariya
Bediya
Bhakha
Bhiyal
Bodidar
Dhokadva
Dhrabavad
Dron
Fareda
Fatsar
Fulka
Gir Gadhada
Harmadiya
Itvaya
Jamvala
Jaragli
Jhanjhariya
Jhudvadli
Juna Ugla
Kanakiya
Kaneri
Kansariya
Khilavad
Kodiya
Mahobatpara
Motisar
Nagadiya
Nava Ugla
Nitli
Panderi
Rasulpara
Sanosri
Sanvav
Sonariya
Sonpura
Thordi
Umedpara
Undari
Vadli
Vadviyala
Velakot

References 

Villages in Gir Gadhada Taluka
Villages in Gir Somnath district